Nori Inc. is a technology startup, based in Seattle and Washington. The company is building financial infrastructures to allow carbon removal projects to measure and get economic revenues from their activity. In creating those financial infrastructures, Nori aims to establish a universal market-driven commodity price on carbon removal. Nori is currently focused on soil-carbon sequestration and prides itself on having paid farmers who adopt regenerative agriculture practices which may contribute to carbon sequestration.

History and funding 

Nori was founded in 2017.

In the winter of 2018, Nori raised $145,548 on Republic's crowdfunding platform when its CEO Paul Gambill pitched Nori on an episode of Meet the Drapers, starring venture capitalist Tim Draper and his family.

Products and services

Nori has created a platform where carbon removal suppliers can get paid by carbon removal buyers. Nori is specifically focused on the growth of financial incentive and supply of carbon removal offsets, not reduction or avoidance offsets.

Nori uses “Nori Carbon Removal Tonnes,” or “NRTs,” on its trading platform to represent one tonne of carbon dioxide that has been removed from the atmosphere for a minimum of 10 years.

NRTs on the Nori platform are generated from agricultural projects that can store carbon dioxide in soil as of April 2021. These soil projects are broadly called regenerative agriculture practices. Nori aims to create a financial instrument that supports growers increasing carbon dioxide sequestration in their soils which can also advance a number of co-benefits of climate change mitigation like drought tolerance, reduced surface runoff pollution, and an overall improvement of soil health.

Nori partners with companies that make carbon quantification tools (CQTs) in order to model how much carbon has been removed. In the case of farmlands, these models work by comparing farmers' new sustainable practices to their previous farming methods. Nori partners with Soil Metrics, which uses a USDA-approved model to run thousands of scenarios to determine how much carbon a farmer has stored in their soils 

Nori is in the process of developing an API for carbon removal that integrates into platforms and applications.

Early adopters 

In early 2020, Maryland farmer Trey Hill became the first seller in Nori's marketplace. He was paid over $115,000 for practices that, over the preceding few years, had sequestered over 8,000 tons of carbon in the soil. Buyers included Shopify Inc., Arizona State University, and individuals looking to remove carbon.

In November 2020, Iowa farmer Kelly Garrett received a check for $75,000 for selling 5,000 carbon removals through Nori's carbon removal marketplace platform and Locus Agricultural Solutions. The buyer of Mr. Garrett's carbon credits was Shopify Inc, who used the carbon removal credits to help negate emissions from the boats, planes and trucks transporting goods sold through Shopify's platform during the Black Friday/Cyber Monday weekend of 27-30  November.

References 

Carbon capture and storage
Sustainable agriculture
Organizations based in Washington (state)